José Meneses (born 8 September 1980) is a Guatemalan sprinter. He competed in the men's 4 × 100 metres relay at the 2000 Summer Olympics.

References

1980 births
Living people
Athletes (track and field) at the 2000 Summer Olympics
Guatemalan male sprinters
Olympic athletes of Guatemala
Athletes (track and field) at the 1999 Pan American Games
Pan American Games competitors for Guatemala
Place of birth missing (living people)
Central American Games silver medalists for Guatemala
Central American Games medalists in athletics